The Saltese Flats is a flat located in Spokane County, Washington, United States. The flats are occupied by the residual wetlands of the now-drained Saltese Lake. The term Saltese Flats is generally used to refer to both the flat and the occupying wetlands. 
The wetlands—which are overlooked by the Saltese Uplands—are primarily fed by Quinnamose and Saltese Creeks, and are also emptied by the latter. 

The wetlands were originally drained for farming, but the Spokane County Environmental Services are actively trying to restore them. The primary goal is to restore the wetlands, and increase late summer water flow into the Spokane River (via the Spokane Valley–Rathdrum Prairie Aquifer).

History
The area known as the Saltese Flats, was once a Lake (even larger than the nearby Liberty Lake), but was drained by Peter Morrison in the 1890s so he could grow Timothy hay on the dry lakebed. Starting in 1894, Morrison used hired laborers and horses to dig  of drainage canals diverting water into Saltese Creek. Within weeks of the canals being finished, the lake had completely drained. The creek, which originally ended at the lake, now carries water an additional  before terminating at what is now known as Shelley Lake. The Lake—originally spelled "Seltice" Lake—was named after Chief Andrew Seltice of the Coeur d'Alene tribe, who lived in a home on the west side of the lake.

References

Wetlands of Washington (state)
Spokane, Washington
Landforms of Spokane County, Washington
Former lakes of the United States